Tristan Scherwey (born 7 May 1991) is a Swiss professional ice hockey winger who is currently playing for SC Bern of the National League (NL). He served as captain of the team for the 2014–15 season. He won five NL titles with Bern in 2010, 2013, 2016, 2017 and 2019. Scherwey also won the Swiss Cup with Bern in 2015. Scherwey represented Switzerland at the 2018 Winter Olympics and won a silver medal at the 2018 World Championship.

Playing career
Scherwey made his professional debut in the 2008–09 season with Young-Sprinters HC, playing 11 games in the Swiss League (SL) on loan from SC Bern's under-20 team. The following season, he made his debut in the National League (NL), appearing in 36 games with SC Bern and putting up 6 points, including 3 goals. On 29 November 2009, Scherwey was suspended for two games by the SIHF for a boarding on Genève-Servette HC's John Gobbi who was knocked unconscious and transported to Bern's hospital. On 23 April 2010, Scherwey was suspended for the next NL final game against Genève-Servette HC for a boarding on Daniel Vukovic. He played his last junior games with Bern U20 team in 2011, the same year he turned pro, signing a two-year contract with SC Bern.

On 9 August 2012, Scherwey agreed to a two-year contract extension to remain in Bern. On 5 April 2013, Scherwey was suspended for one game for a check to the head of HC Fribourg-Gottéron's Benjamin Plüss. The suspension was then brought up to two more games. Fribourg-Gottéron still appealed the decision and Scherwey was eventually suspended four games.

On 29 September 2014, Scherwey was signed to a five-year contract extension by Bern. On 3 January 2015, Scherwey was suspended for one game for a check to the head of Lausanne HC's Gaetan Augsburger. The suspension was then brought up to five games by the SIHF. On 14 January 2016, Scherwey was suspended for three games for a check to the head of Genève-Servette HC's Daniel Rubin and was also fined CHF 1,750 for the incident. On 29 March 2016, Scherwey was suspended for the first game of the NL final against HC Lugano for a check to the head of HC Davos's Marcus Paulsson during the playoffs semi-finals. He was also fined CHF 1,450. On 5 September 2016, Scherwey was suspended for one game by the IIHF for a check to the head in a CHL game against Kosice HC. On 3 November 2016, Scherwey was fined CHF 900 for a simulation. On 24 November 2016, Scherwey was suspended for one game and fined CHF 1,910 for an Interference on EHC Kloten's Daniele Grassi.

On February 6, 2019, Scherwey agreed to a seven-year contract extension with Bern worth CHF 4.9 million through the 2026/2027 season. At the conclusion of the 2018-19 season, Scherwey was voted by the fans as the league's Most Popular Player.

Scherwey was invited to attend the Ottawa Senators' main training camp in September 2019, forcing him to miss SC Bern's first 8 games of the 2019/20 NL regular season. His contract situation with Bern prevented him from signing a deal with any other team, including an NHL team. An NHL-out clause will be available in his new contract when it kicks off in the summer of 2020.

International play

Scherwey was named to Switzerland's under-18 team for the 2009 IIHF World U18 Championships in the United States. He played 6 games, tallying 5 points (3 goals) to help Switzerland avoid relegation. Scherwey was named to Switzerland's under-20 team for the 2010 World Junior Ice Hockey Championships in Canada. He played 7 games, scoring 3 points (1 goal) to help Switzerland finish 4th in the tournament, falling to Canada in the semi-finals. He was again named to the team for the 2011 edition. He played 5 games, scoring no point as Switzerland finished 5th in the tournament, falling to Canada in the quarter-finals.

Scherwey made his debut with Switzerland men's team in the 2012–13 season and scored his first goal in 2015. He represented Switzerland at the 2018 Winter Olympics, appearing in all 4 games. That same season, Scherwey also made his World Championship debut with the men's team at the 2018 IIHF World Championship in Denmark where he tallied 4 points (2 goals) in 10 games as Switzerland won silver, falling to Sweden in the shootout. Scherwey made the team again for the 2019 IIHF World Championship in Slovakia and tallied 4 points (2 goals) in 8 games.

Personal life
Scherwey was born in Wunnewil-Flamatt, a municipality in the canton of Fribourg. He was an avid fan of HC Fribourg-Gottéron as a kid and attended games in the standing section. He speaks French, German and English fluently. Scherwey started playing hockey with HC Fribourg-Gottéron's youth teams before moving to Bern to play with SC Bern's under-17 and under-20 teams.

Scherwey has a brother, Cyrille, who also plays hockey. He is currently playing in the Premier League, the fourth tier of Swiss ice hockey, with the Argovia Stars.

Career statistics

Regular season and playoffs

International

References

External links

1991 births
Living people
Neuchâtel Young Sprinters HC players
SC Bern players
Ice hockey players at the 2018 Winter Olympics
Olympic ice hockey players of Switzerland
Swiss ice hockey forwards
Sportspeople from the canton of Fribourg